Bad Company is the debut studio album by the English hard rock supergroup Bad Company. The album was recorded at Headley Grange with Ronnie Lane's Mobile Studio in November 1973, and it was the first album released on Led Zeppelin's Swan Song Records label.

Reception and legacy
The album reached the top of the US Billboard 200. Since then, the album has been certified five times platinum by the RIAA, and became the 46th best selling album of the 1970s. The album spent 25 weeks in the UK Albums Chart, entering at No. 10 on June 15, 1974, and reaching its highest position of No. 3 in the second week. Kerrang! magazine listed the album at No. 40 among the "100 Greatest Heavy Metal Albums of All Time". The album was also included in the book 1001 Albums You Must Hear Before You Die. In 2000 it was voted number 323 in Colin Larkin's All Time Top 1000 Albums.

The singles "Can't Get Enough" and "Movin' On" peaked at No. 5 and No. 19 on the Billboard Hot 100, respectively. "Rock Steady", "Bad Company" and "Ready for Love" (the last originally recorded by guitarist Mick Ralphs during his tenure with Mott the Hoople on their 1972 album All the Young Dudes) are also classic rock radio staples.

Ultimate Classic Rock critic Matt Wardlaw named four songs from Bad Company – "Bad Company", "Can't Get Enough", "Ready for Love" and "Seagull" – to be among Bad Company's 10 greatest songs.

Versions
The album was remastered and re-released in 1994. In 2006 an audiophile mastered 24K gold CD was released by Audio Fidelity.

Track listing

Personnel
Bad Company
 Paul Rodgers – vocals, rhythm (1) and acoustic (8) guitars, piano (4, 5), tambourine (8)
 Mick Ralphs – lead guitar (all but 8), keyboards (3, 6)
 Boz Burrell – bass (all but 8)
 Simon Kirke – drums (all but 8)
Additional personnel
 Sue Glover and Sunny Leslie – backing vocals (4)
 Mel Collins – saxophones (6)
 Ron Fawcus – tape operator
 Hipgnosis – sleeve design, photography
 Ron Nevison – engineer, mixing
 Steve Hoffman – mastering
 Barry Diament – mastering
 Beverly Taddei – production co-ordination
 Bob Wynne – art direction

Charts
Album

Year-end charts

References

External links

 
 Lyrics of covers by Queen + Paul Rodgers at Queen official website: "Can't Get Enough" (from Return of the Champions), "Seagull", "Bad Company" (from Live in Ukraine)
 Bad Company - Bad Company (1974) album review by Thomas Erlewine, credits & releases at AllMusic
 Bad Company - Bad Company (1974) album releases & credits at Discogs
 Bad Company - Bad Company (1974, Deluxe Edition, 2015 Remaster) album to be listened as stream on Spotify

1974 debut albums
Albums with cover art by Hipgnosis
Bad Company albums
Island Records albums
Swan Song Records albums